Lance Edward "Lem" Massey (20 September 1909 – 4 June 1942) was a U.S. Navy pilot during World War II.

Early life
He was born in Syracuse, New York, the only child of Walter Griffith Massey and Florence Lance Massey. Growing up in Watertown, New York, he attended two years of high school in Watertown, and then entered Severn School in Severna Park, Maryland, in 1925. After graduating from Severn in 1926, he was accepted into the U.S. Naval Academy when he was sixteen.

Flying career
After graduating from the Naval Academy in 1930, he was given his commission as an ensign. One of his classmates was Dudley W. Morton. His first assignment was the battleship . After serving for a year aboard the Texas he entered flight training at Naval Air Station Pensacola in 1931 and was awarded Naval Aviator wings in January 1932. He was assigned to Scouting Squadron 3 aboard the aircraft carrier  for the next three years. He subsequently served a two-year tour at Pensacola Naval Air Station in Florida as a flight instructor. While at Pensacola, he married Marjorie Drake Kelsey, the widow of Lieutenant (j.g.) James Kelsey. In June 1937, Lieutenant (jg) Massey reported to Observation Squadron 3 aboard the battleship . In August 1937, he was promoted to lieutenant.

He was promoted to the rank of lieutenant commander in January 1942. His sole combat mission from Enterprise occurred on 1 February 1942, during the Marshalls-Gilberts raids, when he led VT-3's Second Division in the first airborne torpedo attack in U.S. naval history. His nine Douglas TBD Devastator torpedo bombers attacked Japanese shipping at Kwajalein Atoll in the Marshall Islands, with Massey personally sinking the 18,000-ton Japanese transport Bordeaux Maru. For this action, he was awarded the Distinguished Flying Cross.

Midway
On 14 April 1942, he took command of Torpedo Squadron Three (VT-3) aboard , then based at Kaneohe Naval Air Station. On 27 May 1942, VT-3 was transferred to  following the Battle of the Coral Sea, replacing that ship's own Torpedo Squadron 5 (VT-5). Yorktown sailed with VT-3 for Midway Island and entered battle on 4 June 1942. During this crucial encounter, Massey was killed while leading his squadron in a low-level attack against the Japanese aircraft carrier Hiryū. He was last seen  Escorted by only six F4F Wildcat fighters, led by Lieutenant Commander John Thach, ten out of VT-3's twelve TBD's were lost. For his heroism in pursuing the attack on Hiryu, Massey was posthumously awarded the Navy Cross.

In addition to his widow Marjorie, he was survived by two sons, CDR Lance Bradford Massey (USN, Ret.) and Walter Drake Massey.

In popular culture
Massey was depicted in the 1976 war film Midway by actor Steve Kanaly.

References

External links 
 LCDR Lance E. Massey bio (history.navy.mil)

1909 births
1942 deaths
United States Navy officers
Recipients of the Navy Cross (United States)
United States Naval Academy alumni
Battle of Midway
United States Navy personnel killed in World War II
Military personnel from Syracuse, New York
Recipients of the Distinguished Flying Cross (United States)
United States Navy pilots of World War II
United States Navy bomber pilots of World War II